Robert Barnard (23 November 1936 – 19 September 2013) was an English crime writer, critic and lecturer. In addition to over 40 books published under his own name, he also published four books under the pseudonym Bernard Bastable.

Life and work 
Robert Barnard was born on 23 November 1936 at Burnham-on-Crouch, Essex. He was educated at the Colchester Royal Grammar School and at Balliol College, Oxford.

He spent five years (1961-1965) as an academic in the English Department at the University of New England, at Armidale, New South Wales, in Australia.

His first crime novel, Death of an Old Goat, was published in 1974. The novel was written while he was a lecturer at University of Tromsø in Norway. He went on to write more than 40 other books and numerous short stories. As "Bernard Bastable", he published two standalone novels and two alternate history books, featuring Wolfgang Mozart – who had here survived to old age – as a detective.

Barnard was inducted into the prestigious Detection Club in 1991, and was awarded the Cartier Diamond Dagger in 2003 by the Crime Writers Association for a lifetime of achievement. He said that his favourite crime writer was Agatha Christie. In 1980 he published a critique of her work titled A Talent to Deceive: An Appreciation of Agatha Christie.

Barnard died on 19 September 2013. He and his wife Louise lived in Yorkshire.

Bibliography

Mystery novels
 Death of an Old Goat (1974) 
 A Little Local Murder (1976)
 Death on the High Cs (1977)
 Blood Brotherhood (1977) 
 Unruly Son (1978) a.k.a. Death of a Mystery Writer
 Posthumous Papers (1979) a.k.a. Death of a Literary Widow
 Death in a Cold Climate (1980)
 Mother's Boys (1981) a.k.a. Death of a Perfect Mother
 Little Victims (1983) a.k.a. School for Murder
 Out of the Blackout (1984)
 A Corpse in a Gilded Cage (1984)
 Disposal of the Living (1985) a.k.a. Fete Fatale 
 Political Suicide (1986)
 The Skeleton in the Grass (1987)
 At Death's Door (1988) 
 A City of Strangers (1990) 
 A Scandal in Belgravia (1991) 
 Masters of the House (1994) 
 Touched by the Dead (1999) a.k.a. A Murder in Mayfair 
 Unholy Dying (2000) a.k.a. Turbulent Priest 
 The Mistress of Alderley (2002) 
 A Cry From The Dark (2003) 
 The Graveyard Position (2004) 
 Dying Flames (2005) 
 Last Post (2008) 
 Stranger in the Family (2010)

Charlie Peace novels
 Death and the Chaste Apprentice (1989) 
 A Fatal Attachment (1992) 
 A Hovering of Vultures (1993) 
 The Bad Samaritan (1995) 
 No Place of Safety (1997) 
 The Corpse at the Haworth Tandoori (1998) 
 The Bones in the Attic (2001) 
 A Fall from Grace (2006) 
 The Killings on Jubilee Terrace (2009) 
 A Charitable Body (2012)

Perry Trethowan novels
 Death by Sheer Torture (1981)
 Death and the Princess (1982)
 The Missing Bronte (1983)
 Bodies (1986)
 Death in Purple Prose (1987) a.k.a. The Cherry Blossom Corpse

Short story collections
 Death of a Salesperson and Other Untimely Exits (1989) 
 The Habit of Widowhood (1996) 
 Rogue's Gallery (2011)

Novels written as Bernard Bastable
 To Die Like a Gentleman (1993)
 Dead, Mr. Mozart (1995) 
 Mansion and its Murder (1998) 
 Too Many Notes, Mr. Mozart (1998)

Non-fiction
 Imagery and Theme in the Novels of Dickens (1974)
 A Talent to Deceive: An Appreciation of Agatha Christie (1980)
 A Short History of English Literature (1984) 
 Emily Brontë (British Library Writers' lives series) (2000) 
 A Brontë Encyclopedia (with Louise Barnard) (2007)

Notes

References
 Ford, Susan Allen. "Stately Homes of England: Robert Barnard's Country House Mysteries" in CLUES: A Journal of Detection 23.4 (Summer 2005):  3–14.

External links
 Internet Book List
 CWA Award Announcement
 1984 interview with Robert Barnard by Don Swaim at Wired for Books
 2006 audio interview with Robert Barnard by  Elizabeth Foxwell

1936 births
2013 deaths
Alumni of Balliol College, Oxford
English crime fiction writers
English mystery writers
People educated at Colchester Royal Grammar School
Academic staff of the University of Tromsø
Cartier Diamond Dagger winners
Agatha Award winners
Nero Award winners
Anthony Award winners
Macavity Award winners
Barry Award winners
Writers from Essex
20th-century English novelists
21st-century English novelists
English male short story writers
English short story writers
English male novelists
20th-century British short story writers
21st-century British short story writers
20th-century English male writers
21st-century English male writers
People from Burnham-on-Crouch
20th-century pseudonymous writers
Members of the Detection Club